, known as Digimon: Digital Monsters in English-speaking territories, is a 1999 Japanese anime television series produced by Toei Animation in cooperation with WiZ, Bandai and Fuji Television. It is the first anime series in the Digimon media franchise, based on the Digital Monster virtual pet released in 1997.

A 1999 short film titled Digimon Adventure was released in theaters on March 6, 1999. This was followed by a television series, which aired in Japan from March 1999 to March 2000 for 54 episodes. A film sequel titled Digimon Adventure: Our War Game! was released in theaters in March 2000. Both Digimon Adventure films were compiled and released as Digimon: The Movie in North America in October 2000.

Since the release of Digimon Adventure, several sequels and adaptations have been produced. A succeeding television series, Digimon Adventure 02, was broadcast from 2000 to 2001. A video game adaptation of the series was released for PlayStation Portable in 2013. For the series' 15th anniversary, a six-part film series taking place a few years after the events of Adventure 02, titled Digimon Adventure tri., was released between 2015 and 2018. A final film titled Digimon Adventure: Last Evolution Kizuna was released in 2020.

A reboot of the series set in the year 2020, titled Digimon Adventure, was broadcast in Japan from 2020 to 2021.

Plot 

On August 1, 1999, seven children are transported into the Digital World by Digivices that appeared before them at summer camp, where they befriend several Digimon (Digital Monsters). The kids' Digivices allow their partner Digimon to Digivolve into stronger forms and combat enemies. As the kids explore to find a way home, they learn that they are "DigiDestined", children chosen to save the Digital World. During their adventure, the DigiDestined are hunted by a demonic Digimon named Devimon, who uses black gears to corrupt various Digimon into attacking the group. After defeating Devimon, the DigiDestined are contacted by Gennai and instructed to reach the Server Continent to retrieve artifacts called Crests, allowing their Digimon partners to Digivolve into their Ultimate forms. But the group are targeted by another opponent, Etemon once reaching Server before Tai and MetalGreymon defeat him, only to be sucked through a vortex to the real world.

Tai and Agumon manage to return and reunite with the group after they were being kept apart by DemiDevimon, a servant of the evil Myotismon who seeks to enter the real world to kill the 8th DigiDestined member. The DigiDestined follow after Myotismon’s forces to their home of Odaiba, with the 8th child revealed to be Tai's younger sister, Kari and that Myotismon’s lieutenant Gatomon is her Digimon partner. Following a series of battles, Agumon and Gabumon are able to finally defeat Myotismon with their Mega forms they gained through Warp Digivolution.

When the boundaries between the human and Digital Worlds begin to intersect, the DigiDestined return to the Digital World to face the Dark Masters, a quartet of mega-level Digimon who each took control of a part of the Digital World. In the midst of their battles, they learn that they were chosen to save the human and Digital Worlds from intersecting four years ago. But tension leads to infighting within the group and causes them to temporarily separate. After reflecting, the DigiDestined reunite to defeat Piedmon, the last Dark Master, and confront Apocalymon, who attempts to destroy both worlds. Apocalymon destroys their Crests, but the DigiDestined realize the power of their Crests were inside them all along and manage to defeat him. With the Digital World restored, Tai and his friends leave their Digimon partners behind and return to their normal lives.

Development 
In 1999, a short film based on the virtual pets called Digimon Adventure was released. However, shortly after the film's storyboard was completed in 1998, producers at Toei Animation were requested to turn it into a television series.

The DigiDestined's character designs were created by Katsuyoshi Nakatsuru. The staff had decided to name the characters based on kanji that related to luck.

Media

Anime 

Digimon Adventure was produced by Toei Animation and ran for 54 episodes on Fuji TV between March 7, 1999, and March 26, 2000. The main opening theme for all episodes aired in Japan is "Butter-Fly" by Kōji Wada, which peaked at #47 on the Oricon Weekly Singles Chart. "I Wish" by AiM is used as the ending theme from episodes 1–26, while "Keep On", AiM's 5th single, served as the ending theme from episodes 27–54. On August 1, 2014, during the series' 15th anniversary, a Blu-ray Disc box of the original series was announced and set for release in Japan on March 15, 2015.

Saban Entertainment licensed the series in North America and produced an English-language version under the title Digimon: Digital Monsters, which aired on Fox Kids Network between August 14, 1999 and June 24, 2000. The English version featured an original soundtrack and made changes to character names, as well as edits pertaining to certain aspects such as violence to make the series more suitable for younger audiences. Wendee Lee, Michael Sorich and David Walsh became the voice directors. The original soundtrack of the show was replaced by music composed by Udi Harpaz and Shuki Levy, which recycled several music soundtracks from Starcom: The U.S. Space Force, Princess Sissi, Masked Rider and Spider-Man: The Animated Series. The opening theme for all episodes is "Digimon Theme" by Paul Gordon. "Hey Digimon" by Gordon, an insert song featured in the show, and was released on the original soundtrack of Digimon: The Movie along with "Digimon Theme".

The series was released on DVD by Twentieth Century Fox (Saban's parent company) in 2000 and by Buena Vista Home Entertainment in 2002. A complete DVD boxset of the English dub was released by New Video Group on October 9, 2012 in the U.S and was released by Madman Entertainment on June 18, 2014 in Australia. On March 14, 2022, Discotek Media announced that they are releasing a Blu-ray collection. The English dub version was released on December 27, 2022, while the original Japanese version will be released in 2023 (which will be the first Digimon anime series to be both presented in the original Japanese and English dub versions).

Digimon Adventure was added to the Netflix Instant Streaming service along with Digimon Adventure 02 from August 3, 2013 to August 1, 2015 in separate English dubbed and Japanese subtitled versions.

Films 

Several short films based on the series were released in theaters in Japan. Digimon Adventure was originally released on March 6, 1999. The story focuses on Tai and Kari finding a Digi-egg from their computer, which hatches and quickly Digivolves into Greymon, culminating in a battle with Parrotmon. The film grossed ¥650 million.

Digimon Adventure: Our War Game! was originally released on March 4, 2000. In the film, Tai and Izzy find a virus Digimon who Digivolves into Diaboromon, resulting in him infecting the Internet and launches nuclear missiles towards their home. The film introduces DNA Digivolution through Omnimon. The film grossed ¥2.166 billion. Our War Game! later served as the inspiration for director Mamoru Hosoda's film Summer Wars.

The two short films were combined with Digimon Adventure 02: Part 1: Digimon Hurricane Landing!! / Part 2: Supreme Evolution!! The Golden Digimentals and was released as Digimon: The Movie in North America on October 6, 2000. Digimon: The Movie was altered from the original script to remove "culturally awkward" Japanese elements and introduced jokes suitable for a North American audience. Originally, scriptwriter Jeff Nimoy wanted to combine Digimon Adventure and Our War Game! while releasing Digimon Hurricane Landing / Supreme Evolution!! The Golden Digimentals as a direct-to-television movie, but the idea was overruled. In order to connect the film's stories, the script was rewritten to include Willis involved in Diaboromon's creation.

, a stereoscopic 3D short film, was shown at Toei Animation Festival on October 3, 2009 and was later included on a set of DVD works released on February 21, 2010.

Manga and comics 

A manga adaptation illustrated by Yu Yuen Wong was published in five volumes. Tokyopop published the series in English. In North America, a comic book adaptation of the Devimon arc was published by Dark Horse Comics between May and November 2000.

Light novels 
Hiro Masaki, one of the screenwriters of Digimon Adventure, co-wrote a novelization of Digimon Adventure with series director Hiroyuki Kakudō. The light novels were separated into three parts.

Drama CDs 
A series of mini-drama CDs were released throughout the run of Digimon Adventure and included supplementary audio dramas. In addition to this, character image songs for the main DigiDestined were included.

 , was released on November 5, 1999 and is centered on Tai, Sora, and Joe.
 , was released on December 3, 1999 and is centered on Izzy, Mimi, and Kari.
 , was released on January 7, 2000 and is centered on Matt and T.K.
 A full-length drama CD,  was released on April 23, 2003 and follows the lives of Tai, Matt, Sora, Izzy, Mimi, and Joe in the two-and-a-half year period before Digimon Adventure 02.

Video games 

Characters and Digimon from Adventure appear throughout many video games based on the franchise, such as Digimon Rumble Arena.

An RPG based on the original storyline of Adventure developed by Prope and published by Namco Bandai Games, also title Digimon Adventure, was released for the PlayStation Portable on January 17, 2013, part of the line-up of video games of the 15th anniversary celebration of the franchise. The game covers the entire series as well as the second Japanese film, Bokura no War Game, and sees the return of all the main voice actors. The game also features original story elements and an unlockable dungeon mode featuring the protagonists of the other anime series in the franchise.

Reception 

On its initial release, the series found a rather large success in the United States. When it was first released in North America, the series was seen as an attempt to imitate the success of Nintendo's Pokémon franchise. Entertainment Weekly magazine named Digimon as the "Worst Pokémon/Net Crossbreeding Attempt" in 2000. However, audiences eventually noticed that compared to Pokémon, the characters interacted and developed realistically, as well as the integration of more complicated science fiction stories and societal themes. The English dub gradually improved as well, making fewer and fewer alterations to the Japanese original by later episodes. As a result, many young viewers quickly outgrew Pokémon and migrated to Digimon instead.

Despite the criticism, it placed first at the start of the May 2000 Nielsen ratings sweeps, surpassing Pokémon: Adventures on the Orange Islands among viewers aged 2–11 and 6–11. Retailers and businesses such as snack food company Jel Sert and toy store chain Toys "R" Us capitalized on the popularity of the series by licensing it for promotion with their own products. Web search engine Lycos listed Digimon as the number five fad of 2000, and it ranked 35th on the list of the year's top searches.

On Anime News Network, Luke Carroll gave the Digimon: Digital Monsters - Collection 2 DVD an overall grade of D+.

Notes

References

External links 
 Official website
 Official sequel website
 

1990s Japanese television series
1999 Japanese television series debuts
1999 anime films
1999 anime television series debuts
2000 Japanese television series endings
2000 anime films
Adventure anime and manga
Animated television series about children
Animated television shows based on films
Adventure
Discotek Media
Fuji TV original programming
Fiction set in 1999
Isekai anime and manga
Isekai novels and light novels
Japanese children's animated action television series
Japanese children's animated adventure television series
Japanese children's animated science fantasy television series
Japanese animated films
Television series about parallel universes
Television series about summer camps
Television series by Saban Entertainment
Toei Animation television